A greyhound is a cocktail consisting of grapefruit juice and gin mixed and served over ice. If the rim of the glass has been salted, the drink is instead called a salty dog.

History

The earliest known mention of a cocktail of this description is in bartender and author Harry Craddock's Savoy Cocktail Book of 1930.  Craddock describes his recipe as "...a variation of the Grapefruit Cocktail", suggesting that such cocktails were already in common use before his book was written.  His recipe consists of nothing but gin, grapefruit juice and ice.

A recipe for a similar cocktail with the name "Greyhound" appears in Harper's Magazine in 1945 (volume 191, page 461) thus: "The cocktails were made of vodka, sugar, and canned grapefruit juice a greyhound.  This cocktail was served at Greyhound's popular restaurant chain that was located at bus terminals, called 'Post House'."

Before 1945, vodka was an uncommon spirit and most drinks we think of today as "classic cocktails" and which call for vodka, originally would have contained gin.  As vodka's popularity grew after the war and gin's popularity waned, many of the popular cocktails persisted, albeit with vodka substituted for gin. The most conspicuous of these is the martini which, before 1945, would invariably have been made with gin.

The reason that most cocktails during and just after prohibition were prepared with salted or sugared rims is because the quality of alcoholic beverages was not so appealing. Also, more recently, both the greyhounds and the salty dogs are more often made with vodka not gin. The root cause of this is for taste preferences and to serve a broader market.

Garnish

For the greyhound, twist of lime or lemon.

Variations

Vodka greyhound: uses vodka instead of gin.

Salty dog: has a salted rim on the glass and uses vodka sometimes.

Dalmatian: has black pepper syrup and vodka.

Some similar cocktails use grapefruit soda instead of grapefruit juice, notably the Finnish Lonkero (ready-to-drink mix of grapefruit soda and gin) and the Mexican Paloma (grapefruit soda and tequila).

See also
 
 List of cocktails

References

Cocktails with vodka
Cocktails with gin
Citrus cocktails
Sour cocktails
Two-ingredient cocktails
Cocktails with grapefruit juice